Sorbus insignis is a species of rowan. It is native to SW China (NW Yunnan and E Tibet), NE India (Manipur, Sikkim), Myanmar, and Nepal.

The plant is sometimes grown as an ornamental plant in stone gardens, parks and yards.

References

External links
 Sorbus insignis info

insignis
Trees of Myanmar
Trees of China
Flora of East Himalaya
Flora of Assam (region)
Trees of Nepal